Karkatsi (Dargwa: Къяркъяцимахьи) is a rural locality (a selo) in Urarinsky Selsoviet, Dakhadayevsky District, Republic of Dagestan, Russia. The population was 70 as of 2010.

Geography 
Karkatsi is located 39 km southwest of Urkarakh (the district's administrative centre) by road. Muskilimakhi and Kurkimakhi are the nearest rural localities.

Nationalities 
Dargins live there.

References 

Rural localities in Dakhadayevsky District